The 1908–09 season is the 35th season of competitive football by Rangers.

Overview
Rangers played a total of 41 competitive matches during the 1908–09 season. The team finished fourth in the league, six points behind champions Celtic, after only winning 19 of there 34 matches.

The Scottish Cup campaign was thrown out against the league champions after a 2–2 draw at Hampden Park. The final was replayed a week later at the national stadium and finished 1–1, the competition was abandoned and trophy withheld following a riot after the replay.

Results
All results are written with Rangers' score first.

Scottish League Division One

Scottish Cup

Appearances

 Source: Fitbastats

See also
 1908–09 in Scottish football
 1908–09 Scottish Cup
 Edinburgh Exhibition Cup

Rangers F.C. seasons
Rangers